Andreas Skovgaard Larsen (born 27 March 1997) is a Danish professional footballer who plays for Stabæk as a centre back.

Career
Skovgaard received his professional debut for FC Nordsjælland on 28 February 2016 against Viborg FF in the Danish Superliga, that ended with a 1–1 draw. He came on the pitch in the 85nd minute, where he replaced Tobias Mikkelsen.

He was promoted to the first-team squad in March 2016 and he also signed a new professional contract until 2018.

Skovgaard left Nordsjælland at the end of his contract, which was at the end of 2018. This was announced on 18 December 2018.

On 5 February 2020, it was announced that Skoovgard will go on a season long loan to Swedish club Örebro SK in Allsvenskan. After returning to Heerenveen, his contract was terminated by mutual consent on 1 February 2021.

On 12 February 2021, Örebro SK announced that they had signed Skovgaard permanently on a two-year deal. 

On 27 February 2022, Skovsgaard signed for Norwegian club SK Brann with a contract lasting until the end of 2024. In February 2023 he moved to Stabæk.

References

1997 births
Living people
Association football defenders
Danish men's footballers
Danish expatriate men's footballers
FC Nordsjælland players
SC Heerenveen players
Örebro SK players
Danish Superliga players
Allsvenskan players
Danish expatriate sportspeople in the Netherlands
Danish expatriate sportspeople in Sweden
Expatriate footballers in the Netherlands
Expatriate footballers in Sweden
SK Brann players
Danish expatriate sportspeople in Norway
Expatriate footballers in Norway
People from Kalundborg Municipality
Stabæk Fotball players